The postulation that 'Allah' (the name of God in Islam) originated as a moon god first arose in 1901 in the scholarship of archeologist Hugo Winckler, who identified the name Allah with a pre-Islamic Arabian deity known as Hubal, which he called a lunar deity.

The general idea was widely propagated in the United States in the 1990s by Christian apologists, first via the publication of Robert Morey's pamphlet The Moon-god Allah: In Archeology of the Middle East (1994),  eventually followed by his book The Islamic Invasion: Confronting the World's Fastest-Growing Religion (2001). Morey argued, slightly differently, that "Allah" was the name of a moon goddess in pre-Islamic Arabic mythology. Islam's use of a lunar calendar and the prevalence of crescent moon imagery in Islam have also been used to support the notion.

Both iterations of the theory have been dismissed by modern scholars as entirely unevidenced, and their ongoing propagation as an insult both to Muslims and to Arab Christians, who likewise refer to God as 'Allah'.

Scholarly views

Before Islam, the Kaaba contained a statue representing the god Hubal. On the basis that the Kaaba was also Allah's house, Julius Wellhausen considered Hubal to be an ancient name for Allah. The 20th-century scholar Hugo Winckler in turn claimed that Hubal was a moon god,  though others have suggested otherwise. David Leeming describes him as a warrior and rain god, as does Mircea Eliade.

More recent scholars have rejected this view, partly because it is speculation but also because of the Nabataean origins of Hubal, a non-native deity imported into the Southern Arabian shrine – one which may have already been associated with Allah. Patricia Crone argues that "If Hubal and Allah had been one and the same deity, Hubal ought to have survived as an epithet of Allah, which he did not. And moreover there would not have been traditions in which people are asked to renounce the one for the other." Joseph Lumbard, a professor of classical Islam, has stated that the idea is "not only an insult to Muslims but also an insult to Arab Christians who use the name 'Allah' for God."

Christian proponents
Robert Morey's book The Moon-god Allah in the Archeology of the Middle East claims that Al-‘Uzzá is identical in origin to Hubal, whom he asserts to be a lunar deity. This teaching is repeated in the Chick tracts "Allah Had No Son" and "The Little Bride". In 1996 Janet Parshall, in syndicated radio broadcasts, asserted that Muslims worship a moon god. Pat Robertson said in 2003, "The struggle is whether Hubal, the Moon God of Mecca, known as Allah, is supreme, or whether the Judeo-Christian Jehovah God of the Bible is Supreme."

However, recent research from various sources have proven that the "evidence" used by Morey was of the statue retrieved from an excavation site at Hazor, of which there is no connection to "Allah" at all.  In fact, Bible scholar and mission strategist Rick Brown openly disagrees with this approach and said:

Those who claim that Allah is a pagan deity, most notably the moon god, often base their claims on the fact that a symbol of the crescent moon adorns the tops of many mosques and is widely used as a symbol of Islam. It is in fact true that before the coming of Islam many "gods" and idols were worshipped in the Middle East, but the name of the moon god was Sîn, not Allah, and he was not particularly popular in Arabia, the birthplace of Islam. The most prominent idol in Mecca was a god called Hubal, and there is no proof that he was a moon god. It is sometimes claimed that there is a temple to the moon god at Hazor in Palestine. This is based on a representation there of a supplicant wearing a crescent-like pendant. It is not clear, however, that the pendant symbolizes a moon god, and in any case this is not an Arab religious site but an ancient Canaanite site, which was destroyed by Joshua in about 1250 BC. ... If the ancient Arabs worshipped hundreds of idols, then no doubt the moon god Sîn was included, for even the Hebrews were prone to worship the sun and the moon and the stars, but there is no clear evidence that moon-worship was prominent among the Arabs in any way or that the crescent was used as the symbol of a moon god, and Allah was certainly not the moon god's name.

In 2009, anthropologist Gregory Starrett wrote, "a recent survey by the Council for American Islamic Relations reports that as many as 10% of Americans believe Muslims are pagans who worship a moon god or goddess, a belief energetically disseminated by some Christian activists." Ibrahim Hooper of the Council on American-Islamic Relations (CAIR) calls the Moon-God theories of Allah evangelical "fantasies" that are "perpetuated in their comic books".

Farzana Hassan sees these views as an extension of long-standing Christian claims that Muhammad was an impostor and deceiver, and has stated: "Literature circulated by the Christian Coalition perpetuates the popular Christian belief about Islam being a pagan religion, borrowing aspects of Judeo-Christian monotheism by elevating the moon god Hubal to the rank of Supreme God, or Allah. Muhammad, for fundamentalist Christians, remains an impostor who commissioned his companions to copy words of the Bible as they sat in dark inaccessible places, far removed from public gaze."

Muslim views
In 8th-century Arab historian Hisham Ibn Al-Kalbi's Book of Idols, the idol Hubal is described as a human figure with a gold hand (replacing the original hand that had broken off the statue). He had seven arrows that were used for divination.

Whether or not Hubal was even associated with the moon, both Muhammad and his enemies clearly identified Hubal and Allah as different gods, their supporters fighting on opposing sides in the Battle of Badr. Ibn Hisham notes that Abu Sufyan ibn Harb, leader of the defeated anti-Islamic army, called to Hubal for support to gain victory in their next battle:

The Quran itself forbids moon worship in verse 37 of Sura Fussilat:

Islam teaches that Allah is the name of God (as iterated in the Quran), and is the same god worshipped by the members of other Abrahamic religions such as Christianity and Judaism.

Pre-Islamic traditions

Before Muhammad, Allah was not considered the sole divinity by Meccans; however, Allah was considered the creator of the world and the giver of rain. The notion of the term may have been vague in the Meccan religion. Allah was associated with companions, whom pre-Islamic Arabs considered as subordinate deities. Meccans held that a kind of kinship existed between Allah and the jinn. The Meccans possibly associated angels with Allah. Allah was invoked in times of distress. Muhammad's father's name was  meaning "the slave of Allāh".

 See also 

 References 

External links
 Islamic Awareness, Reply To Robert Morey's Moon-God Allah Myth: A Look At The Archaeological Evidence Retrieved 21 October 2012
 Bismika Allahuma'', Do Muslims Worship Allah The Moon God? Retrieved 8 July 2017

1901 introductions
Allah
Evangelicalism in the United States
Fringe theories
Lunar gods
Linguistic hoaxes
Pseudohistory
Pseudolinguistics
Religious hoaxes